Magnolia Hill may refer to:

 Magnolia, Seattle, a neighborhood in Seattle, Washington
Magnolia Hill (Natchez, Mississippi), listed on the NRHP in Adams County, Mississippi

See also
Magnolia Grove (disambiguation)
Magnolia Mound